Phragmacossia tigrisia is a species of moth of the family Cossidae. It is found in Iraq.

References

Moths described in 1924
Zeuzerinae